Proton-coupled amino acid transporter 1 is a protein that in humans is encoded by the SLC36A1 gene.

This gene encodes a member of the eukaryote-specific amino acid/auxin permease (AAAP) 1 transporter family. The encoded protein functions as a proton-dependent, small amino acid transporter. This gene is clustered with related family members on chromosome 5q33.1.

See also
 Solute carrier family
 Proton coupled amino acid transporter

References

Further reading

Solute carrier family